Polskie Elektrownie Jądrowe sp. z o.o. (abbreviated PEJ) is a developer of nuclear power plants in Poland. It is a special purpose vehicle 100% owned by the State Treasury. The company is specifically charged with developing 6 to 9GWe of proven, large-scale, Generation III(+) pressurized water reactors such as the AP1000, APR-1400, and  EPR.

Until March 2021, the functions of PEJ were a part of the PGE Group (Polska Grupa Energetyczna).

Proposed Nuclear Power Plant at Lubiatowo-Kopalino site
On December 22, 2021, PEJ announced the preferred location for Poland's first commercial nuclear power plant as the Baltic Sea coastal commune of Choczewo in Wejherowo County, Pomeranian Voivodeship at a site called Lubiatowo-Kopalino.

The siting investigation conducted by PGE and PEJ included screening 92 potential locations before detailed studies were conducted two final candidate sties. Two sites in Pomorskie - Żarnowiec and Lubiatowo-Kopalino – were subject to more detailed scrutiny and the results published in the Environmental Impact Assessment (EIA) Report submitted to the General Director for Environmental Protection on March 29, 2022. The EIA considered multiple reactors generating up to 3,750MWe at the site.

A reactor technology provider has not been selected for the project though several designs have been proposed including the AP1000, APR-1400, and  EPR.

Proposed Inland Nuclear Power Plant
A second nuclear power plant at an inland location is being explored to follow the proposed first nuclear power plant on the Baltic Sea coast.

See also

 Nuclear power in Poland

References

External links
 

Energy in Poland